Tea (minor planet designation: 453 Tea) is an S-type asteroid belonging to the Flora family in the Main Belt. Its diameter is about 21 km and it has an albedo of 0.183. Its rotation period is 6.4 hours.

In the 1980s Tea was considered as a target for the planned French Vesta spacecraft. The spacecraft was not built.

Tea was discovered by Auguste Charlois on February 22, 1900. Its provisional name was 1900 FA. It is unknown after what it was named.

References

External links
 
 

Flora asteroids
Tea
Tea
S-type asteroids (Tholen)
S-type asteroids (SMASS)
19000222